Taylorsville is an unincorporated community in Highland County, in the U.S. state of Ohio.

History
Taylorsville was laid out in 1846, and named after the local Taylor family. A post office called New Corwin was established in 1849, the name was changed to Taylorsville in 1897, and the post office closed in 1935.

Notable people
 Wilbur J. Carr, diplomat

References

Unincorporated communities in Highland County, Ohio
Unincorporated communities in Ohio